Balodis (Old orthography: Ballod; feminine: Balode) is a Latvian surname, derived from the Latvian word for "pigeon". Individuals with the surname include:

 Jānis Balodis  (1881–1965), an army general and politician who was a principal figure in the foundation and government of independent Latvia
 Kārlis Balodis (1864–1931), a Latvian economist, financist, statistician and demographist
 Ringolds Balodis (born 1986), Latvian politician
 Ves Balodis (born 1933), an Australian former discus thrower who competed in the 1956 Summer Olympics

See also 
 4391 Balodis

Latvian-language masculine surnames